Callorhinus gilmorei is an extinct species of fur seal that lived in Japan and western North America during the Pliocene and Early Pleistocene. 

Callorhinus gilmorei was similar to its close relative, the living northern fur seal. It mainly differed in having more primitive dental features, such as double-rooted cheek teeth.

References

Pliocene pinnipeds
Pliocene mammals of North America
Pliocene mammals of Asia
Prehistoric pinnipeds of North America
Mammals described in 1986